Eulepidotis perlata is a moth of the family Erebidae first described by Achille Guenée in 1852. It is found in the Neotropics, including Costa Rica, Panama, Peru, French Guiana and Guyana.

References

Moths described in 1852
perlata